Frankenstein is a former municipality in the district of Mittelsachsen, in Saxony, Germany. About 1100 people live there. With effect from 1 January 2012, it has been incorporated into the town of Oederan.

References 

Mittelsachsen
Former municipalities in Saxony